The 1982–83 Tunisian Ligue Professionnelle 1 (Tunisian National Championship)  season was the 28th season of top-tier football in Tunisia. The competition began on 26 September 1982, and ended on 29 May 1983. The defending champions from the previous season are Espérance de Tunis.

Teams and venues

Results

League table

Result table

Leaders

Top goalscorers

References

External links
 Tunisie 82/83 Les résultats at footballvintage.net 

Tun
Tunisian Ligue Professionnelle 1 seasons
1